Jalan Cabang, Federal Route 178, is a continuous federal road in Johor, Malaysia. The Kilometre Zero of the Federal Route 178 starts at Port of Tanjung Pelepas Highway junctions.

Features

At most sections, the Federal Route 178 was built under the JKR R5 road standard, allowing maximum speed limit of up to 90 km/h.

List of junctions

References

Malaysian Federal Roads